Wanze is a municipality of Wallonia located in the province of Liège, Belgium. 

The municipality consists of the following districts: Antheit, Bas-Oha, Huccorgne, Moha, Vinalmont, and Wanze.

Notable residents
 Paul Delvaux (1897–1994), painter, born in Antheit
 Frédéric François (born 1950), singer, resident of Antheit

See also 
 List of protected heritage sites in Wanze

References

External links
 

Municipalities of Liège Province